OG 82 was an Allied convoy of the OG (Outward to Gibraltar) series during World War II.
The action involving this convoy resulted in the destruction of a U-boat, and also had consequences for German U-boat strategy.

Forces involved
OG 82 comprised 17 ships outward bound to Gibraltar, carrying war materials and trade goods.
The convoy commodore was Captain AJ Baxter in Baron Yarborough, and the convoy was protected by an understrength escort group. This was 36th Escort Group, led by Cdr FJ "Johnnie" Walker, consisting of the sloop  and the s , Pentstemon,  and Gardenia (joined 13 April). The convoy's protection was enhanced by armed merchants— the CAM ships Empire Eve and Empire Heath, and the rescue ship Toward.

Action
OG 82 left Liverpool on 8 April 1942. On 14 April 1942 OG 82 was at the western edge of the Bay of Biscay when it was  encountered by U-252, inbound to France after completing her first war patrol.
Her skipper, KL Kai Lerchner, sent a sighting report stating that the convoy was lightly escorted and that he was starting to shadow.

His radio signal was picked up and DFed by Royal Navy land stations and reported to Walker. He quickly dispatched his four corvettes to search for the U-boat, which was picked up on radar by Vetch. As Vetch closed to attack, U-252 crash-dived and launched two torpedoes which narrowly missed the corvette. Arriving in Stork, Walker then sent the others corvettes back to the convoy and commenced a hunt with Vetch Together they made several attacks, dropping 45 depth charges in total, and U-252 was destroyed.

No further attacks took place and OG 82 arrived at Gibraltar on 20 April without loss.

Ships in the convoy

Allied merchant ships
A total of 17 merchant vessels joined the convoy, either in Liverpool or later in the voyage.

Convoy escorts
The 36th Escort Group of armed military ships escorted the convoy at various strengths during its journey.

U-boats

Aftermath
This small action resulted in the destruction of one U-boat, but had far-reaching consequences. U-252’s disappearance, after reporting an encounter with a lightly escorted convoy, was similar to the disappearance six weeks previously of U-82 in the same area. From this, Befehlshaber der U-Boote (BdU) Karl Dönitz reached the erroneous conclusion that the Allies were running a decoy operation, sending heavily armed anti-submarine vessels disguised as a weak convoy to act as a U-boat trap. He therefore instructed his U-boat force to avoid attacking convoys in the Biscay area, an unexpected benefit to the Allies from this brief action.

Notes

References
 Clay Blair : Hitler’s U-Boat War Vol I (The Hunters 1939–1942) (1996) 
 Arnold Hague The Allied Convoy System 1939–1945 (2000).  (Canada) .  (UK)
 Paul Kemp U-Boats Destroyed (1999) 
Stephen Roskill : The War at Sea 1939–1945 Vol II (1956). ISBN (none)
 DEG Wemyss : Walker's Groups in the Western Approaches (1948). ISBN (none)

External links
   OG 82 at convoyweb.org.uk
 U-252 at uboat.net

OG082
C